Conejo Island, in Spanish Isla Conejo, meaning "rabbit island", is a Honduran Island alongside many other islands in the region. El Salvador has disputed the Honduran island located in the Gulf of Fonseca.

History
In 1992, the International Court of Justice (ICJ) ruled on the delimitation of bolsones (disputed areas) along the El Salvador–Honduras boundary, OAS intervention and a further ICJ ruling in 2003, full demarcation of the border concluded; the 1992 ICJ ruling advised a tripartite resolution to a maritime boundary in the Gulf of Fonseca advocating Honduran access to the Pacific. Unlike other major islands of the Gulf of Fonseca, Rabbit Island was never put to discussion in the definition even though the government of El Salvador asked for a clarification of the situation of every island in the Gulf of Fonseca. The island, despite its small size, is a strategic point of naval and military value to both Honduras and El Salvador.

References

WorldStatesman- El Salvador & Honduras
Land, Island and Maritime Frontier Dispute (El Salvador/Honduras: Nicaragua intervening), International Court of Justice case registry
Application for Revision of the Judgment of 11 September 1992 in the Case concerning the Land, Island and Maritime Frontier Dispute (El Salvador/Honduras: Nicaragua intervening) (El Salvador v. Honduras), International Court of Justice case registry

Pacific islands of Honduras
Territorial disputes of Honduras
Territorial disputes of El Salvador
El Salvador–Honduras border
Islands of El Salvador